National Power was an energy company based in the United Kingdom.

History 

National Power was formed following the privatisation of the UK electricity market in 1990. In England and Wales the Central Electricity Generating Board, which was responsible for the generation and transmission of electricity, was split into four companies. Its generation (or upstream) activities were transferred to three generating companies – 'PowerGen', 'National Power', and 'Nuclear Electric' (later 'British Energy', eventually 'EDF Energy') – and its transmission (or downstream) activities to the 'National Grid Company'.

National Power was the largest of these new companies having around 52 percent of the generating market. It later diversified into the supply market in November 1998 by purchasing the supply business of the regional electricity company Midlands Electricity and created the Npower supply brand.

On 2 October 2000 following investor pressure the company demerged into two separate companies Innogy, which was responsible for the UK based operations, and International Power, which took over the international operations. Innogy is now known as 'RWE npower' owned by the German utility company RWE; and International Power is fully owned by the French company GDF Suez.

References

See also
Energy policy of the United Kingdom
Energy use and conservation in the United Kingdom
Npower UK

Companies disestablished in 2001
Companies formerly listed on the London Stock Exchange
Defunct electric power companies of the United Kingdom
Electric power generation in the United Kingdom
Energy companies established in 1990
Former nationalised industries of the United Kingdom
Non-renewable resource companies established in 1990
1991 establishments in the United Kingdom
2001 disestablishments in the United Kingdom
Utilities of the United Kingdom